Victor Ramon Rosa Neto (born 14 January 2000), known as Victor Ramon, is a Brazilian professional footballer who plays as a centre-back for Chilean Primera División side Deportes La Serena.

Career
On November 10, 2020, Ramon made his professional debut as a starting player for Guarani in the Série B match against Cruzeiro and last featured in a Série B game on January 20, 2021, playing just seven minutes versus Vitória in a 2-1 defeat.

In September 2021, he moved to Chile and joined Deportes La Serena in the Chilean Primera División.

References

External links
 
 Victor Ramon at playmakerstats.com (English version of ceroacero.es)
 

2000 births
Living people
Brazilian footballers
Association football defenders
Clube Atlético Juventus players
Guarani FC players
Deportes La Serena footballers
Campeonato Brasileiro Série B players
Chilean Primera División players
Brazilian expatriate footballers
Expatriate footballers in Chile
Brazilian expatriate sportspeople in Chile
Place of birth missing (living people)